The Myosha (Mişä) is a river in Tatarstan, Russian Federation, a right-bank tributary of the Kama. It flows southward, east of and parallel to the Volga and joins the Kama just before that river joins the Volga. It originates in a forest near the Yatmas-Dusay village of the Kukmorsky District and flows into the Kuybyshev Reservoir west of Narmonka village. The river is fed by snow and rain, and from November till April it is usually frozen.

Major tributaries are the Kazkash, Little Myosha, Tyamtibash, Nyrsa, Nurminka, and Sula rivers. Myosha is a local recreation zone. Since 1978 it has been protected as a natural monument of Tatarstan.

References 

Rivers of Tatarstan